Nostoc Flats is a small, flat glacial outwash plain, the surface of which is covered by the algae Nostoc. The feature is located East of the south lobe of Joyce Glacier on the Scott Coast, Victoria Land. So named by the New Zealand Geographic Board (NZGB) in 1994.

Plains of Antarctica
Landforms of Victoria Land
Scott Coast